Der Container Exklusiv is a 2006 German TV Endemol game-show production, with the format of early Big Brother Germany (BB) TV shows. There were 18 contestants (see below: Nominations). The show was broadcast on Premiere channel, which is the broadcaster that showed the 24-hour streaming of German Big Brother. The show began on 27 February 2006 and was meant to finish on 31 July 2006 (155 days), but due to poor ratings/subscriber levels, the show finished officially on 5 June 2006 (99 days), with final rounds of votes among all who remained. The prize for the winner was 150,000 Euro originally, but due to the shortened season, the final prize was 100,000 Euro (about US$140,000). The presenter was Christian Möllmann, a housemate in BB2 Germany. They used house number 9 from Big Brother Germany 6.  The show started with 6 Housemates, adding a few each month. Nominations took place on Mondays, at 2-week intervals. Each Housemate nominated 1 person. Evictions were on alternate Mondays to the nominations, and the evicted Housemate was decided by a public vote of TV viewers.

Concept
After the station RTL II decision to end Big Brother Germany, after the sixth season (before deciding to return with season 7 in 2007), Premiere and Endemol decided to jointly market its own season of the format under a different name. It tried to focus too heavily on the early seasons of Big Brother Germany.

Just as in the fifth and sixth seasons of Big Brother Germany, the video feed for Der Container Exklusiv was broadcast 24 hours live on a private, fee-based television channel. From 4 April 2006, a channel excluding the so-called happy hour from 17:00-18:00, unlocked viewing for all its customers. There have also been on the TV channel Premiere, daily shows at 20:00 clock to see the daily highlights from Der Container and each week on Mondays at 20:15 some highlights (with weekly nomination, or an excerpt). The shows were hosted by Christian Möllmann.

Premises
The venues of Der Container Exklusiv were the exclusive premises of the Big Brother village in Ossendorf. There also, the sixth season of the German Big Brother was produced. After the end of first premiere recordings beamed from the casting of the container from exclusive. On 27 February 2006 from 1:00 clock then went the first six residents at number seven - the former assistant area - a. In subsequent weeks, the number of residents increased to ten and on 10 March, the parade took place in the actual "container" instead. This lasted for number 9 - the former head of the field - including the garden with a swimming pool, the former Big Bar and the gym. The Big Bar was transformed into the bedroom, and the bedroom of the former Big Brother residents into the dining room. For the final broadcast on 5 June, it was used as the fitness studio.

Supervision of residents
As with the Big Brother format, contestants were also monitored in Der Container Exklusiv around-the-clock by video cameras and microphones. There were camera-free clock hours between 7:00-8:00, and no images were transferred from the bedroom.

Number of inhabitants, nominations, winning sum
Living together in the container were ten residents. According to a statement which could be provided voluntarily or by eviction, moved to a new resident. Every two weeks, the residents nominated two (possibly with a tie more than two) candidates for expulsion. After this nomination, the audience had a vote by tele-voting. In the weeks following the nomination, then decided the audience via telephone, who of the nominees would remain. The candidate receiving the fewest viewer votes was thrown out then. Towards the end of the season, the number of residents decreased gradually, until eventually a winner - the candidate Sergei - remained. He received a prize of 100,000 euros. Before the announcement of a premature end, Staffell and Endemol/Premiere had promised the winner a sum of 150,000 €. However, simultaneously with the announcement of a premature end, without further comments, the earnings premium had been reduced by one third.

Budget and weekly tasks
The budget, with which each resident had to purchase food and other goods available, was seven euros (~US$10) per inhabitant per day. A share of 20-50%, of this basic budget, they had to use for weekly tasks in which they had to perform, for example, their ability to provide athletic performance or ability to learn a test. When a task was passed, the basic budget was added; otherwise, when a task was failed, the basic budget was subtracted from a player's total.

Housemates

Entered on Day 1 (26 February 2009):
Iris "Crazy" Lauermann, 30
Ertu Kile, 25
Maik, 38
Mareen Drewes, 26
Sandra Wesolek, 27
Sergej Janssen, 29

New Housemates:
Entered on Day 8 (6 March 2009):
Jasmin "Jazmin" Jennewein
Entered on Day 15 (13 March):
Aksana
Peter
Tanyol
Entered on Day 22:
Andreas (replacement for Tanyol)
Entered on Day 25:
Vesselina "Vessy" Angelova (replacement for Aksana)
Entered on Day 29:
Hakan Kaveller
Entered on Day 43:
Davorka Tovilo
Entered on Day 50:
Jasmin Holzmann (replacement for Maik)
Entered on Day 57:
Thorsten Hoffeld
Entered on Day 71 (8 May 2009):
Anja Kociemba

Nominations

References 
 Parts of this article were translated from the German Wikipedia article.

German reality television series
2006 German television series debuts
2006 German television series endings
German-language television shows